Gladys George (born Gladys Clare Evans; September 13, 1904 – December 8, 1954) was an American actress of stage and screen. Though nominated for an Academy Award for her leading role in Valiant Is the Word for Carrie (1936), she spent most of her career in supporting roles in films such as Marie Antoinette (1938), The Roaring Twenties (1939), The Maltese Falcon (1941), The Best Years of Our Lives (1946), and Flamingo Road (1949).

Early life
George was born on September 13, 1904 in Patten, Maine to British parents, Sir Arthur Evans Clare, a "noted Shakespearean actor", and his wife, Lady Alice. Another source indicated "Gladys was born in a little town in Missouri, where the troupe her parents belonged to happened to be stranded at the time."

Career
George went on the stage at the age of 3 and toured the United States, appearing with her parents, who were British actors. She starred onstage in the 1920s, and she had made several films during the early part of that decade. For her role in the film Valiant Is the Word for Carrie (1936), she received a Best Actress nomination at the 9th Academy Awards. 

Other roles were in Madame X (1937), Marie Antoinette (1938), The Roaring Twenties (1939), The Way of All Flesh (1940), The Maltese Falcon (1941), The Best Years of Our Lives (1946), He Ran All the Way (1951), Detective Story (1951), and Lullaby of Broadway (1951).  

George's Broadway credits include The Distant City, Lady in Waiting, and The Betrothal.

Personal life
Gladys George was married and divorced four times. All of the unions were childless.
 On March 31, 1922, she and actor Ben Erway eloped and were married by a judge in Oakland, California. "They were remarried in San Luis Obispo August 3 of the same year. They separated September 14, 1930." The couple divorced in October 1930.
 Her second husband was millionaire paper manufacturer Edward Fowler, who walked out in 1933 after finding the actress in the arms of her leading man Leonard Penn. At the time, George was playing a nymphomaniacal star in the Broadway hit Personal Appearance.
 George and actor Leonard Penn were married in a probate court in New Haven, Connecticut, September 19, 1935.
 Her last husband Kenneth Bradley, whom she married when she was 41, was a hotel bellboy 20 years her junior.

Health
George was afflicted with numerous ailments, including throat cancer, heart disease, and cirrhosis of the liver. She died from a cerebral hemorrhage in 1954 in Los Angeles, California, aged 50, and was interred in the Valhalla Memorial Park Cemetery in Burbank, California.

Filmography

References

Further reading

External links

 
 

1904 births
1954 deaths
Actresses from Maine
American film actresses
American stage actresses
American television actresses
Burials at Valhalla Memorial Park Cemetery
American people of English descent
People from Patten, Maine
Vaudeville performers
Deaths from cancer in California
Deaths from esophageal cancer
Deaths from cirrhosis
20th-century American actresses
Alcohol-related deaths in California